Lafitte may refer to:

 Lafitte (surname)
 Lafitte, Louisiana
 Jean Lafitte, Louisiana
 Lafitte, Tarn-et-Garonne, a commune in southern France
 Lafitte Greenway, a trail for pedestrians and bicycles in New Orleans, Louisiana
 Lafitte Projects, in the 6th Ward of New Orleans, Louisiana
 Lafitte's Blacksmith Shop in the French Quarter of New Orleans
 Jean Lafitte National Historical Park and Preserve, includes several regions in south Louisiana

See also
 Château Lafite Rothschild, a French winemaker
 Laffitte (disambiguation)